Margaret Howard may refer to:

Margaret Howard, Duchess of Norfolk, née Margaret Audley, (died 1564) 
Margaret Howard, Countess of Nottingham, née Margaret Stewart, (1591–1639) 
Lady Margaret Howard, stepmother of Queen Katherine Howard, married Lord Edmund Howard
Margaret Howard, Lady Arundel, sister of Queen Katherine Howard
Lady Margaret Sackville (1562–1591), née Howard, wife of Robert Sackville, 2nd Earl of Dorset